Mattar MRT station is an underground Mass Rapid Transit station on the Downtown line in Geylang planning area, Singapore. As its name suggests, it is located underneath Mattar Road, at the junction of Merpati Road.

The station serves places such as Canossa Convent School, Masjid Sallim Mattar and The Church of St Stephen (Roman Catholic). One of the entrances is adjacent to the Circuit Road hawker centre.

History
The station was first announced on 20 August 2010 when the 16 stations of the  Downtown Line Stage 3 (DTL3) from the River Valley (now Fort Canning) to Expo stations were unveiled. The line was expected to be completed in 2017. Construction of the station and the tunnels was scheduled to commence in the second quarter of this year and was targeted to be completed in 2017.

On 11 July 2012, a Downtown line 3 (DTL3) Tunnelling Works Ceremony was held at this station.

The station opened on 21 October 2017, as announced by the Land Transport Authority on 31 May that year.

References

External links

Railway stations in Singapore opened in 2017
Geylang
Mass Rapid Transit (Singapore) stations